Brassolis sophorae is a species of large butterfly in the family Nymphalidae. It is found in South America.

The larvae feed on a wide range of plants, including Acrocomia aculeata, Archontophoenix alexandrae, Arecastrum romazoffianum, Astrocaryum, Attalea, Bactris (including Bactris major), Butia eriospatha, Caryota mitis, Caryota urens, Chrysalidocarpus lutescens, Cocos nucifera, Copernicia cerifera, Desmoncus, Euterpe, Hyophorbe lagenicaulis, Livinstona chinensis, Mauritia flexuosa, Neodypsis decaryi, Orbignya, Phoenix canariensis, Phoenix dactylifera, Phoenix reclinata, Pritchardia pacifica, Ptychosperma macarthurii, Roystonea oleracea, Roystonea regia, Roystonea venezuelana, Sabal mauritiiformis, Sabal umbraculiferus, Scheelea macrocarpa, Washingtonia filifera, Saccharum officinarum, Musa sapientum, Ravenala madagascariensis and Strelitzia nicolai.

Subspecies
Brassolis sophorae sophorae
Brassolis sophorae ardens Stichel, 1903 (Peru, Ecuador)
Brassolis sophorae dinizi d'Almeida, 1956 (Brazil: Paraíba)
Brassolis sophorae laurentii Stichel, 1925
Brassolis sophorae luridus Stichel, 1902 (Colombia)
Brassolis sophorae vulpeculus Stichel, 1902 (Paraguay)
Brassolis sophorae philomela Stichel, 1925 (Ecuador)

References

Butterflies described in 1758
Morphinae
Fauna of Brazil
Nymphalidae of South America
Taxa named by Carl Linnaeus